The 2006–07 Charlotte Bobcats season was Charlotte's 17th season in the National Basketball Association (NBA), and their third as the Bobcats.

Draft picks

Roster

Regular season

Season standings

Record vs. opponents

Game log

|- bgcolor="edbebf"
| 1 || November 1 || Indiana || 99–106 || Okafor (19) || Okafor (13) || Knight (7) ||Charlotte Bobcats Arena18,518 || 0–1
|- bgcolor="edbebf"
| 2 || November 3 || @ Memphis || 83–96 || Morrison (21) || Okafor (8) || Felton (8) ||FedExForum13,787 || 0–2
|- bgcolor="bbffbb"
| 3 || November 4 || Cleveland || 92–88 || Felton (23) || May (9) || Knight (7) ||Charlotte Bobcats Arena19,147 || 1–2
|- bgcolor="edbebf"
| 4 || November 8 || @ Boston || 108–110 (OT) || Okafor (28) || Okafor (18) || Knight (7) ||TD Banknorth Garden15,183 || 1–3
|- bgcolor="edbebf"
| 5 || November 10 || Seattle || 85–99 || Okafor (20) || Okafor (15) || Knight (7) ||Charlotte Bobcats Arena13,515 || 1–4
|- bgcolor="edbebf"
| 6 || November 12 || Denver || 101–108 || Emeka Okafor (22) || Emeka Okafor (15) || Brevin Knight (7) ||Charlotte Bobcats Arena13,203 || 1–5
|- bgcolor="edbebf"
| 7 || November 14 || @ NO/Oklahoma City || 85–94 || Emeka Okafor (25) || Emeka Okafor (16) || Raymond Felton (5) || Ford Center16,623 || 1–6
|- bgcolor="bbffbb"
| 8 || November 15 || @ San Antonio || 95–92 (OT)|| Morrison (27) || Okafor (9) || Knight (9) ||AT&T Center18,797 || 2–6
|- bgcolor="edbebf"
| 9 || November 18 || @ Orlando || 83–97 || Okafor (26) || Okafor (9) || Felton (10) ||TD Waterhouse Centre17,451 || 2–7
|- bgcolor="edbebf"
| 10 || November 20 || Dallas || 85–93 || Okafor (22) || Okafor (13) || Wallace, Knight (5) ||Charlotte Bobcats Arena13,237 || 2–8
|- bgcolor="bbffbb"
| 11 || November 22 || Boston || 92–83 || Morrison (26) || Okafor (13) || Felton (9) ||Charlotte Bobcats Arena14,129 || 3–8
|- bgcolor="edbebf"
| 12 || November 24 || @ Detroit || 95–104 || Okafor (23) || Okafor (12) || Knight (9) ||The Palace of Auburn Hills22,076 || 3–9
|- bgcolor="edbebf"
| 13 || November 25 || Miami || 93–102 || Adam Morrison (27) || Gerald Wallace, Emeka Okafor (11) || Brevin Knight (8) ||Charlotte Bobcats Arena19,403 || 3–10
|- bgcolor="bbffbb"
| 14 || November 28 || @ New Jersey || 96–92 || Adam Morrison (22) || Emeka Okafor, Sean May (7) || Sean May, Adam Morrison, Brevin Knight (5) ||Continental Airlines Arena14,531 || 4–10
|- bgcolor="edbebf"
| 15 || November 29 || @ Atlanta || 90–99 || Raymond Felton, Sean May (21) || Sean May (17) || Raymond Felton (7) || Philips Arena13,296 || 4–11
|-

|- bgcolor="edbebf"
| 16 || December 1 || @ Washington || 109–121 || Adam Morrison (23) || Emeka Okafor (13) || Brevin Knight (9) ||Verizon Center18,853 || 4–12
|- bgcolor="bbffbb"
| 17 || December 3 || Detroit || 97–89 || Emeka Okafor (18) || Gerald Wallace (10) || Brevin Knight (14) ||Charlotte Bobcats Arena13,272 || 5–12
|- bgcolor="edbebf"
| 18 || December 6 || San Antonio || 76–96 || Sean May (18) || Emeka Okafor (9) || Raymond Felton (9) ||Charlotte Bobcats Arena14,066 || 5–13
|- bgcolor="edbebf"
| 19 || December 8 || Houston || 62–92 || Raymond Felton (16) || Emeka Okafor, Primoz Brezec, Sean May (6) || Raymond Felton (6) || Charlotte Bobcats Arena14,414 || 5–14
|- bgcolor="edbebf"
| 20 || December 10 || Phoenix || 84–114 || Sean May (26) || Sean May (10) || Raymond Felton (9) ||Charlotte Bobcats Arena13,571 || 5–15
|- bgcolor="edbebf"
| 21 || December 13 || @ Cleveland || 101–104 || Adam Morrison (16) || Sean May (13) || Brevin Knight (14) ||Quicken Loans Arena20,562 || 5–16
|- bgcolor="bbffbb"
| 22 || December 14 || Orlando || 99–89 || Sean May (32) || Emeka Okafor (11) || Brevin Knight (7) ||Charlotte Bobcats Arena17,751 || 6–16
|- bgcolor="edbebf"
| 23 || December 16 || Boston || 100–106 ||  Gerald Wallace (31) || Emeka Okafor (19) || Raymond Felton (6) || Charlotte Bobcats Arena15,109 || 6–17
|- bgcolor="edbebf"
| 24 || December 20 || @ New York || 109–111 (2OT) || Gerald Wallace (28) || Emeka Okafor (13) || Raymond Felton (16) ||Madison Square Garden17,462 || 6–18
|- bgcolor="bbffbb"
| 25 || December 22 || Utah || 101–89 || Emeka Okafor (21) || Primoz Brezec (11) || Raymond Felton (12) || Charlotte Bobcats Arena14,310 || 7–18
|- bgcolor="edbebf"
| 26 || December 23 || @ Chicago || 76–115 || Melvin Ely (13) || Emeka Okafor (12) || Raymond Felton (9) ||United Center22,093 || 7–19
|- bgcolor="edbebf"
| 27 || December 26 || @ Dallas || 84–97 || Adam Morrison (17) || Emeka Okafor (7) || Raymond Felton (9) ||American Airlines Center20,423 || 7–20
|- bgcolor="edbebf"
| 28 || December 27 || Washington || 107–114 || Gerald Wallace (40) || Gerald Wallace (14) || Raymond Felton (8) || Charlotte Bobcats Arena17,221 || 7–21
|- bgcolor="bbffbb"
| 29 || December 29 || L. A. Lakers || 133–124 (3OT) || Gerald Wallace (28) || Emeka Okafor (25) || Raymond Felton (15) || Charlotte Bobcats Arena19,561 || 8–21
|- bgcolor="bbffbb"
| 30 || December 30 || @ Indiana || 113–102 || Adam Morrison (30) || Emeka Okafor (14) || Raymond Felton (19) ||Conseco Fieldhouse17,305 || 9–21
|-

|- bgcolor="edbebf"
| 31 || January 1 || Minnesota || 96–102 || Matt Carroll (23) || Emeka Okafor (14)  || Raymond Felton (9) || Charlotte Bobcats Arena14,827 || 9–22
|- bgcolor="edbebf"
| 32 || January 5 || @ Orlando || 74–106 || Matt Carroll (19) || Primoz Brezec (12) || Raymond Felton (7) || Amway Arena17,154 || 9–23
|- bgcolor="bbffbb"
| 33 || January 10 || @ Detroit || 103–96 || Raymond Felton (18) || Emeka Okafor (10) || Raymond Felton (7) ||The Palace of Auburn Hills22,076 || 10–23
|- bgcolor="bbffbb"
| 34 || January 12 || @ New York || 126–110 || Derek Anderson (29) || Emeka Okafor, Sean May (9) || Raymond Felton (14) ||Madison Square Garden19,171 || 11–23
|- bgcolor="bbffbb"
| 35 || January 13 || Philadelphia || 89–83 || Adam Morrison (17) || Sean May (10) || Raymond Felton (9) ||Charlotte Bobcats Arena15,081 || 12–23
|- bgcolor="edbebf"
| 36 || January 15 || Milwaukee || 91–99 || Matt Carroll (22) || Emeka Okafor (12) || Raymond Felton (9) ||Charlotte Bobcats Arena14,360 || 12–24
|- bgcolor="edbebf"
| 37 || January 17 || New Jersey || 85–92 || Raymond Felton (18) || Emeka Okafor (21) || Adam Morrison (7) ||Charlotte Bobcats Arena13,077 || 12–25
|- bgcolor="bbffbb"
| 38 || January 19 || @ Atlanta || 96–75 || Emeka Okafor (22) || Gerald Wallace (15) || Derek Anderson (5) ||Philips Arena10,147 || 13–25
|- bgcolor="bbffbb"
| 39 || January 20 || Atlanta || 104–85 || Matt Carroll (22) || Emeka Okafor (7) || Jeff McInnis (9) ||Charlotte Bobcats Arena16,781 || 14–25
|- bgcolor="edbebf"
| 40 || January 22 || @ Toronto || 84–105 || Raymond Felton, Gerald Wallace (19) || Gerald Wallace (9) || Raymond Felton (8) ||Air Canada Centre13,997 || 14–26
|- bgcolor="edbebf"
| 41 || January 24 || Detroit || 92–103 || Gerald Wallace (29) || Emeka Okafor (16) || Raymond Felton (8) ||Charlotte Bobcats Arena15,148 || 14–27
|- bgcolor="bbffbb"
| 42 || January 26 || @ L. A. Lakers || 106–97 (OT) || Matt Carroll (24) || Emeka Okafor (18) || Jeff McInnis (6) ||Staples Center18,997 || 15–27
|- bgcolor="edbebf"
| 43 || January 27 || @ Golden State || 105–131 || Adam Morrison (21) || Emeka Okafor (12) || Jeff McInnis (8) ||Oracle Arena17,381 || 15–28
|- bgcolor="bbffbb"
| 44 || January 29 || @ Denver || 105–101 || Gerald Wallace (25) || Gerald Wallace (13) || Raymond Felton (11) ||Pepsi Center15,898 || 16–28
|- bgcolor="bbffbb"
| 45 || January 31 || New York || 104–87 || Gerald Wallace (42) || Emeka Okafor (15) || Raymond Felton (10) ||Charlotte Bobcats Arena13,985 || 17–28
|-

|- bgcolor="edbebf"
| 46 || February 2 || @ Cleveland || 81–101 || Gerald Wallace (16) || Emeka Okafor (7) || Raymond Felton, Jeff McInnis (4) ||Quicken Loans Arena20,562 || 17–29
|- bgcolor="bbffbb"
| 47 || February 3 || Golden State || 98–90 || Raymond Felton (22) || Gerald Wallace (16) || Gerald Wallace, Jeff McInnis (6) ||Charlotte Bobcats Arena15,171 || 18–29
|- bgcolor="edbebf"
| 48 || February 5 || @ Miami || 93–113 || Raymond Felton (20) || Emeka Okafor (11) || Raymond Felton, Jeff McInnis (7) ||AmericanAirlines Arena19,600 || 18–30
|- bgcolor="edbebf"
| 49 || February 7 || @ Philadelphia || 83–92 || Gerald Wallace, Emeka Okafor (16) || Gerald Wallace, Emeka Okafor, Matt Carroll (8) || Raymond Felton (10) ||Wachovia Center11,027 || 18–31
|- bgcolor="edbebf"
| 50 || February 9 || Portland || 100–108 (OT) || Gerald Wallace (30) || Gerald Wallace (15) || Raymond Felton (8) ||Charlotte Bobcats Arena15,013 || 18–32
|- bgcolor="edbebf"
| 51 || February 10 || @ Houston || 83–104 || Raymond Felton (16) || Emeka Okafor (12) || Gerald Wallace, Raymond Felton, Jeff McInnis (5) ||Toyota Center18,061 || 18–33
|- bgcolor="bbffbb"
| 52 || February 14 || Chicago || 100–85 || Gerald Wallace (32) || Emeka Okafor (21) || Raymond Felton (9) ||Charlotte Bobcats Arena14,908 || 19–33
|- bgcolor="bbffbb"
| 53 || February 20 || NO/Oklahoma City || 104–100 || Raymond Felton, Gerald Wallace (21) || Emeka Okafor (15) || Raymond Felton (11) ||Charlotte Bobcats Arena13,007 || 20–33
|- bgcolor="bbffbb"
| 54 || February 21 || @ Minnesota || 100–95 || Adam Morrison (26) || Emeka Okafor (19) || Raymond Felton (7) ||Target Center16,576 || 21–33
|- bgcolor="bbffbb"
| 55 || February 23 || Philadelphia || 102–87 || Gerald Wallace, Matt Carroll, Adam Morrison (19) || Emeka Okafor (16) || Raymond Felton (7) ||Charlotte Bobcats Arena15,781 || 22–33
|- bgcolor="edbebf"
| 56 || February 24 || Toronto || 76–93 || Matt Carroll, Adam Morrison (13) || Emeka Okafor (12) || Gerald Wallace, Raymond Felton (5) ||Charlotte Bobcats Arena17,091 || 22–34
|- bgcolor="edbebf"
| 57 || February 26 || @ L. A. Clippers || 93–100 || Gerald Wallace (20) || Gerald Wallace (12) || Raymond Felton (7) ||Staples Center18,442 || 22–35
|- bgcolor="edbebf"
| 58 || February 28 || @ Sacramento || 120–135 || Gerald Wallace (31) || Gerald Wallace (6) || Gerald Wallace (9) || Arco Arena17,317 || 22–36
|-

|- bgcolor="edbebf"
| 59 || March 1 || @ Portland || 90–127 || Matt Carroll (20) || Jake Voskuhl, Walter Herrmann (5) || Brevin Knight (4) ||Rose Garden Arena15,063 || 22–37
|- bgcolor="edbebf"
| 60 || March 4 || @ Seattle || 89–96 || Gerald Wallace (19) || Gerald Wallace (9) || Adam Morrison (5) ||KeyArena15,574 || 22–38
|- bgcolor="edbebf"
| 61 || March 5 || @ Utah || 95–120 || Gerald Wallace (33) || Jake Voskuhl (5) || Jeff McInnis (5) ||EnergySolutions Arena19,911 || 22–39
|- bgcolor="edbebf"
| 62 || March 7 || @ Phoenix || 106–115 (OT) || Gerald Wallace, Adam Morrison (22) || Gerald Wallace (15) || Brevin Knight (9) ||US Airways Center18,422 || 22–40
|- bgcolor="edbebf"
| 63 || March 10 || Memphis || 107–115 || Gerald Wallace, Raymond Felton (24) || Gerald Wallace (17) || Brevin Knight (7) ||Charlotte Bobcats Arena17,106 || 22–41
|- bgcolor="bbffbb"
| 64 || March 12 || Orlando || 119–108 || Derek Anderson (24) || Derek Anderson, Gerald Wallace, Jake Voskuhl (5) || Derek Anderson (10) ||Charlotte Bobcats Arena13,762 || 23–41
|- bgcolor="bbffbb"
| 65 || March 14 || Sacramento || 111–108 || Matt Carroll (22) || Jake Voskuhl (13) || Raymond Felton (8) ||Charlotte Bobcats Arena12,848 || 24–41
|- bgcolor="edbebf"
| 66 || March 16 || L. A. Clippers || 93–102 || Raymond Felton (18) || Jake Voskuhl (9) || Gerald Wallace, Raymond Felton (5) ||Charlotte Bobcats Arena17,103 || 24–42
|- bgcolor="edbebf"
| 67 || March 17 || @ Milwaukee || 91–97 || Gerald Wallace (20) || Gerald Wallace (13) || Jeff McInnis (8) ||Bradley Center16,674 || 24–43
|- bgcolor="bbffbb"
| 68 || March 20 || Cleveland || 108–100 (OT) || Gerald Wallace (27) || Gerald Wallace (11) || Raymond Felton (6) ||Charlotte Bobcats Arena17,043 || 25–43
|- bgcolor="bbffbb"
| 69 || March 21 || @ Boston || 92–84 || Raymond Felton (19) || Gerald Wallace (8) || Brevin Knight (8) ||TD Banknorth Garden14,743 || 26–43
|- bgcolor="edbebf"
| 70 || March 23 || @ Philadelphia || 97–106 || Gerald Wallace (21) || Adam Morrison (5) || Gerald Wallace (7) ||Wachovia Center17,104 || 26–44
|- bgcolor="edbebf"
| 71 || March 24 || New Jersey || 107–113 (OT) || Matt Carroll (27) || Walter Herrmann (7) || Brevin Knight (8) ||Charlotte Bobcats Arena18,180 || 26–45
|- bgcolor="bbffbb"
| 72 || March 28 || Atlanta || 101–87 || Gerald Wallace (31) || Gerald Wallace (9) || Raymond Felton (10) ||Charlotte Bobcats Arena14,470 || 27–45
|- bgcolor="bbffbb"
| 73 || March 30 || Milwaukee || 97–81 || Gerald Wallace (24) || Gerald Wallace (13) || Raymond Felton (11) ||Charlotte Bobcats Arena14,739 || 28–45
|-

|- bgcolor="edbebf"
| 74 || April 1 || @ Toronto || 94–107 || Walter Herrmann (22) || Walter Herrmann (8) || Brevin Knight (7) ||Air Canada Centre19,023 || 28–46
|- bgcolor="bbffbb"
| 75 || April 3 || Washington || 122–102 || Gerald Wallace (34) || Gerald Wallace (14) || Raymond Felton (14) ||Charlotte Bobcats Arena14,345 || 29–46
|- bgcolor="bbffbb"
| 76 || April 4 || @ Washington || 108–100 || Gerald Wallace (27) || Gerald Wallace (12) || Gerald Wallace (8) ||Verizon Center15,292 || 30–46
|- bgcolor="edbebf"
| 77 || April 6 || Indiana || 102–112 || Gerald Wallace (29) || Gerald Wallace, Emeka Okafor (9) || Raymond Felton (7) ||Charlotte Bobcats Arena18,939 || 30–47
|- bgcolor="bbffbb"
| 78 || April 8 || @ Miami || 111–103 (OT) || Gerald Wallace (30) || Gerald Wallace, Emeka Okafor (8) || Brevin Knight (7) ||AmericanAirlines Arena19,600 || 31–47
|- bgcolor="bbffbb"
| 79 || April 10 || Miami || 92–82 || Gerald Wallace (24) || Gerald Wallace, Emeka Okafor (10) || Brevin Knight (8) ||Charlotte Bobcats Arena17,105 || 32–47
|- bgcolor="edbebf"
| 80 || April 13 || @ Chicago || 81–100 || Walter Herrmann (14) || Emeka Okafor (11) || Brevin Knight (5) ||United Center22,340 || 32–48
|- bgcolor="bbffbb"
| 81 || April 14 || @ Milwaukee || 113–92 || Walter Herrmann (30) || Walter Herrmann (9) || Jeff McInnis (11) ||Bradley Center17,976 || 33–48
|- bgcolor="edbebf"
| 82 || April 18 || New York || 93–94 || Walter Herrmann (22) || Emeka Okafor (8) || Brevin Knight (13) ||Charlotte Bobcats Arena17,223 || 33–49
|-

Player statistics

|-
| 
| 17 || 0 || 15.1 || .457 || .250 || .826 || 1.9 || 1.2 || .4 || .0 || 5.8
|-
| 
| 50 || 32 || 23.8 || .429 || .355 || .877 || 2.3 || 2.7 || 1.0 || .1 || 8.0
|-
| 
| 58 || 40 || 14.4 || .445 || .333 || .632 || 3.2 || .4 || .2 || .4 || 5.0
|-
| 
| 72 || 47 || 26.1 || .433 || .416 || style=";"| .904 || 2.9 || 1.3 || .7 || .1 || 12.1
|-
| 
| 24 || 0 || 10.2 || .383 || . || .686 || 1.6 || .6 || .1 || .3 || 2.9
|-
| 
| style=";"| 78 || style=";"| 75 || 36.3 || .384 || .330 || .797 || 3.4 || style=";"| 7.0 || 1.5 || .1 || 14.0
|-
| 
| 26 || 0 || 8.5 || .446 || . || .773 || 1.5 || .2 || .0 || .0 || 2.6
|-
| 
| 48 || 12 || 19.5 || .527 || .461 || .774 || 2.9 || .5 || .4 || .1 || 9.2
|-
| 
| 27 || 0 || 6.9 || style=";"| .556 || . || .600 || 1.1 || .0 || .1 || .3 || 2.4
|-
| 
| 45 || 25 || 28.3 || .419 || .056 || .805 || 2.6 || 6.6 || 1.5 || .1 || 9.1
|-
| 
| 35 || 8 || 23.9 || .500 || style=";"| .667 || .768 || 6.7 || 1.9 || .5 || .7 || 11.9
|-
| 
| 38 || 3 || 18.5 || .392 || .125 || .688 || 1.6 || 3.3 || .4 || .0 || 4.3
|-
| 
| style=";"| 78 || 23 || 29.8 || .376 || .337 || .710 || 2.9 || 2.1 || .4 || .1 || 11.8
|-
| 
| 67 || 65 || 34.8 || .532 || . || .593 || style=";"| 11.3 || 1.2 || .9 || style=";"| 2.6 || 14.4
|-
| 
| 21 || 0 || 11.5 || .296 || .000 || .864 || 2.0 || .8 || .6 || .0 || 2.4
|-
| 
| 73 || 9 || 14.3 || .475 || . || .681 || 3.5 || .6 || .4 || .3 || 4.4
|-
| 
| 72 || 71 || style=";"| 36.7 || .502 || .325 || .691 || 7.2 || 2.6 || style=";"| 2.0 || 1.0 || style=";"| 18.1
|-
| 
| 5 || 0 || 6.6 || .308 || .000 || .571 || .6 || .2 || .2 || .0 || 2.4
|}

Awards and records
NBA All-Rookie Second Team
 Wálter Herrmann
 Adam Morrison

Transactions

References

Charlotte Bobcats seasons
Bob
Bob